Marcelo Andrés Silva Fernández (born 21 March 1989) is a Uruguayan professional footballer who plays for Real Salt Lake in Major League Soccer as a central defender.

Club career
Born in Fray Bentos, Silva finished his youth formation in Danubio FC's youth category, making his professional debut on 13 September 2009, against Liverpool F.C. His first career goal came on 5 December, in a 2–0 home win over Central Español.

On 24 July 2010, Silva signed a contract with UD Almería, for an undisclosed fee. He made his La Liga debut on 18 September 2010, in a 0–1 away defeat against RCD Espanyol. He scored his first goal abroad on 5 February 2011, in a 3–2 home win against Espanyol.

In February 2012, after failing to retain a starting spot, Silva was loaned to Peñarol. He scored twice in only 11 league appearances for the Uruguayan giants, also appearing in that year's Copa Libertadores.

Silva appeared 23 times in the 2012–13 season (20 in the league, 1679 minutes of action), netting against CE Sabadell FC and being, however, used mostly as a backup to Ángel Trujillo, Álvaro Mejía and Hernán Pellerano, as the Andalusians were promoted in the play-offs. He only appeared in six matches in the following season, only contributing with 114 minutes in the league.

On 1 August 2014 Silva rescinded his link with the rojiblancos, and signed a one-year deal with UD Las Palmas hours later. On 22 July of the following year he moved to Real Valladolid also in the second level.

On 16 July 2016, Silva signed a one-year contract with Real Zaragoza, still in the same division.

On 3 July 2017, Silva signed with Major League Soccer club Real Salt Lake.

International career
Silva was part of the Uruguay U20 in the 2009 FIFA U-20 World Cup and in the 2009 South American Youth Championship.

References

External links

1989 births
Living people
People from Soriano Department
Uruguayan people of Spanish descent
Uruguayan footballers
Uruguay under-20 international footballers
Association football defenders
Uruguayan Primera División players
Danubio F.C. players
Peñarol players
La Liga players
Segunda División players
UD Almería players
UD Las Palmas players
Real Valladolid players
Real Zaragoza players
Major League Soccer players
Real Salt Lake players
Real Monarchs players
Uruguayan expatriate footballers
Expatriate footballers in Spain
Expatriate soccer players in the United States
USL Championship players